Chromosome 1 open reading frame 112, is a protein that in humans is encoded by the C1orf112 gene, and is located at position 1q24.2. C1orf112 encodes for seventeen variants of mRNA, fifteen of which are functional proteins. C1orf112 has a determined precursor molecular weight of 96.6 kDa and an isoelectric point of 5.62. C1orf112 has been experimentally determined to localize to the mitochondria, although it does not contain a mitochondrial targeting sequence.

Gene 
The gene spans 192,073 base pairs, with 29 different exons. C1orf112 is located at position 1q24.2. C1orf112 shares antisense coding regions with C1orf156 and SCYL3.

Protein 
There are currently eight experimentally determined RefSeq isoforms. C1orf112 has a domain of unknown function DUF4487.

Composition 
Compositional analysis through SAPS predicted much less glycine and much more leucine than expected relative to other human protein sequences. This characteristic is conserved across primate orthologs. A mixed charge cluster was found in Isoform X1 from position 747 to 805, indicating that this segment may be aqueous and tightly bound. This mixed charge cluster is only partially conserved across orthologs

Transcripts 
C1orf112 is determined to have 9 transcripts, or splice variants by Ensembl.

Subcellular Localization 
Antibody immunocytochemistry and immunofluorescent staining of human cell line A-431 indicates C1orf112 is localized to the mitochondria.

Regulation

Gene level regulation

Expression 
Although tissue-level expression is ubiquitous, C1orf112 is expressed highest in the testes, lymph nodes, brain marrow, and cerebellum, with samples from 97 individual in 27 different tissues. In-situ hybridization of the human transcriptome indicates expression is highest in the atrioventricular node, followed by the testis, testis germ cells, and testis interstitial tissue.

Transcript level regulation 
Transcription factor assessment indicates many potential TATA-binding protein and CCAAT-enhancer-binding proteins sites, along with transcription factors associated with the testis, thymus, kidneys, and cardiac tissue.

Protein level regulation 
There are two ubiquitination sites on C1orf112, at position lysine 73 and at position 783 on isoform X1. Downstream of reading frame, there are three polyadenylation signals. In addition, there is an N6-acetyllysine site at leucine 747 and a phosphoserine site at serine 23. C1orf112 has been found experimentally to interact with ATG1, an aldosterone secretion whose overexpression characterizes certain forms of breast cancer. Post-translational modifications predictions include O-glycosyl-oligosaccharide-glycoprotein N-acetylglucosaminyltransferase III and sumoylation, and sumoylation interaction sites.

Interacting proteins 
C1orf112 is predicted to interact with a diverse range of proteins, including multiple mitosis-associated proteins. C1orf112 is also predicted to interact with FIGNL1, a protein involved in DNA double-stranded break repair via homologous recombination. Experimental findings indicate C1orf112 interacts with NUF2, a spindle-pole body protein that plays a critical role in nuclear division, and TTK, a protein kinase capable of phosphorylating serine, threonine, and tyrosine.

Homology/evolution

Paralogs 
There are no known paralogs of C1orf112.

Orthologs 
C1orf112 is highly conserved in Pan troglodytes, Rhinopithecus bieti, Castor canadensis, Miniopterus natalensis, and other select primates, with percent identity relative to Homo sapien C1orf112, with percent identity greater than 90%. Orthologs with the greatest date of divergence (date of speciation) to human C1orf112 include Trichosporon asahii, a placozoa, and Amphimedon queenslandica, indicated that C1orf112 has been preserved over evolutionary time.

Date of divergence was calculated using TimeTree. The E value indicates the number of "hits" one can expect to see by chance when using the NCBI database, with a low E value indicated a significant result. Percent identity is the percentage of character that align to Homo sapien C1orf112 Isoform X1, while percent similarity is the degree of resemblance when the two sequences are aligned with one another.

Protein Structure

Secondary and Tertiary Structure 
C1orf112 secondary structure is predicted to be predominately alpha helical, with < 5% of the protein composed of beta sheets. Ligand binding sites are predicted by I-TASSER from positions 377 to 530 in Isoform X1. A leucine zipper motif is present in Isoform X1 from positions 831-852, predicted by MyHits.

Clinical significance 
C1orf112 was one of many genes found to be co-expressed with cancer-associated genes, and the knockdown of this gene in a HeLa cell line suppressed growth.

References

Further reading